LCCC may refer to:

In cricket:
 Lancashire County Cricket Club, a county cricket club based in the North-West of England
 Leicestershire County Cricket Club, a county cricket club based in the Midlands, England

In education in the United States:
 Lake City Community College, Florida
 Lake County Community College, now the College of Lake County, Grayslake, Illinois
 Laramie County Community College, Wyoming
 Lehigh Carbon Community College, Schnecksville, Pennsylvania
 Lorain County Community College, Ohio
 Luzerne County Community College, Nanticoke, Pennsylvania

In local government:
 Limerick City and County Council, Ireland 
 Lisburn and Castlereagh City Council, Northern Ireland 

In other meanings:
 Lancaster County Convention Center, a convention center in Lancaster, Pennsylvania, USA 
 Locally cartesian closed category in mathematics

See also

 
 LLLC (disambiguation)
 LC3 (disambiguation)
 L3C (disambiguation)
 LC (disambiguation)

 

de:LCCC